Princess Maker 5 is the fifth game from the main Princess Maker series originally released for Microsoft Windows in 2007. A PlayStation 2 versions of the game followed in 2008. That version includes various Gainax references, such as the use of Neon Genesis Evangelion and Gurren Lagann costumes. A  PlayStation Portable version was also released in 2008.

Gameplay
It has several differences from previous titles in the series. The environment has become a modern setting presumably in a fictitious city somewhere in Japan, and instead of being only able to take on the role of a father, the player can now play as a mother or a father.

The gameplay has received several major changes as well, including changes to the scheduling of her courses/work, which no longer follows the monthly timeline but follows a more lengthy weekly timeline. More detailed choices are available on how lenient you are on her diet, curfew, allowance and her disposition towards school, people around her, and how she should think. RPG elements have been implemented as well, though nowhere as intensively as Princess Maker 2, the player can now let his/her daughter go explore in the worlds that are parallel to her own.

The player in this game is a retired hero of a human realm parallel to the modern world. The daughter is a girl from a royal heritage, and one of many candidates to assume the role of princess. However, following the assassinations of the other candidates, she became the target as well. Her entire family is killed during the attempt on her life. As her protector, Cube saved the player's daughter and requested the player to take care of the daughter until she reaches the age of 18. So the journey of parenthood unfolds with Cube's help.

2007 video games
Bishōjo games
CyberFront games
Fantasy video games
Gainax
PlayStation 2 games
PlayStation Portable games
Raising sims
Single-player video games
Video game sequels
Video games developed in Japan
Video games featuring female protagonists
Video games featuring non-playable protagonists
Windows games
ja:プリンセスメーカー5